Jabari Price (born August 31, 1992) is a former American football cornerback. He played college football at North Carolina. He was drafted by the Minnesota Vikings in the seventh round, 225th overall of the 2014 NFL Draft.

High school career
Price attended Blanche Ely High School in Pompano Beach, Florida, where he played as a cornerback and free safety on the football team. As a senior in 2010, opponents threw his way only 23 times and he still made five interceptions and 12 pass break-ups, to go along with 39 tackles and 5 forced fumbles. He helped lead Ely to an 11–2 record and the state 5A regionals, where they nearly pulled off an upset of St. Thomas Aquinas, the nation’s No. 1 team. He earned all-county honors and played in the annual Dade vs. Broward County high school all-star game in January. The United States Achievement Academy named Price an All-American Scholar in 2010.

As a member of Blanche Ely's track & field team, Price competed as a sprinter. In 2008, he took eighth in the 200 meters (23.42s) and eight in the 400-meter dash (52.95s) at the BCAA North Meet. At the FHSAA 4A District Meet, he ran a personal-best time of 11.32 seconds in the 100-meter dash and ran the third leg on the 4 × 100 m relay squad, helping them win the event with a time of 41.48 seconds. He also posted a career-best time of 21.42 seconds in the 200-meter dash at the Charles Johnson Invitational as a senior.

Recruiting
Price was a consensus three-star recruit and was rated the no. 83 cornerback in the country by Rivals. He received 10 NCAA Division I scholarship offers, including letters from Minnesota and Rutgers. He originally gave an oral commitment to Minnesota but ultimately decided to play for the North Carolina Tar Heels in order to be closer to home.

College career
As a true freshman cornerback, Price played in all 13 games, starting in the final four. He recorded 20 tackles, four pass break-ups and one interception. He missed four games his sophomore season due to hand surgery, but still ended up with 16 tackles, two pass break-ups and a tackle for loss. His junior year is when he stepped his game up. In 11 games, he tallied 76 tackles (good for third on the team), 9 pass break-ups (good for first), 4 tackles for loss,
one sack, one forced fumble, one QB hurry and one interception. He registered at least 4 tackles in each game. His final year at UNC, he posted 74 tackles, 4.5 tackles for loss, 9 pass break-ups and a forced fumble while starting all 12 games, earning All-Atlantic Coast Conference honorable mention accolades.

Professional career

After being projected as a fifth-seventh round pick, Price was selected by the Minnesota Vikings in the seventh round (225th overall) of the 2014 NFL Draft. On May 16, 2014, the Vikings signed Price and Kendall James (sixth round) to rookie contracts. He agreed to a 4 year/$2.28 million contract. Price appeared in 14 games as a rookie, recording 10 combined tackles while mostly playing special teams.

Price was suspended for the first two games of the 2015 season for violating the league's substance abuse policy.

On September 3, 2016, he was placed on injured reserve.

On September 2, 2017, Price was released by the Vikings.

Personal life
Price was raised by both parents, Lalanda Price Sr. and Portia Williams, in Pompano Beach. Price's grandmother, Ernestine Price, was a community leader and civil rights activist.

On December 29, 2014, Price was arrested in Hennepin County, Minnesota and charged with a misdemeanor DWI. He was released on bail shortly thereafter. He pled guilty to a reduced charge of careless driving on April 10, 2015, and was sentenced to a $300 fine and 30 days of electronic home monitoring.

References

External links
 North Carolina Tar Heels bio

Living people
1992 births
African-American players of American football
American football cornerbacks
North Carolina Tar Heels football players
Minnesota Vikings players
Players of American football from Florida
Sportspeople from Broward County, Florida
People from Pompano Beach, Florida
Blanche Ely High School alumni
21st-century African-American sportspeople